Pauline is an unincorporated community in Champaign County, Illinois, United States. Pauline is located along a Union Pacific, formerly Chicago and Eastern Illinois, railroad line northeast of St. Joseph. There is no population. There are two grain silos no longer used.

References

Unincorporated communities in Champaign County, Illinois
Unincorporated communities in Illinois